The 2002 Northern Iowa Panthers football team represented the University of Northern Iowa as a member of the Gateway Football Conference during the 2002 NCAA Division I-AA football season. Led by second-year head coach Mark Farley, the Panthers compiled an overall record of 5–6 with a mark of 2–5 in conference play.

Schedule

Roster

References

Northern Iowa
Northern Iowa Panthers football seasons
Northern Iowa Panthers football